Ratko Jelic (born 25 July 2001) is a Serbian born Italian rugby union player, currently playing for United Rugby Championship side Zebre Parma. His preferred position is scrum-half.

He joined with Viadana from 2020 to 2022. He joined  as a permit player for the latter stages of the 2021–22 United Rugby Championship although didn't make an appearance.

In 2021 Jelic was named in Italy Sevens squad for the annual Rugby Europe Sevens.

References

External links 
It's Rugby France profile
All Profile

2001 births
Sportspeople from Belgrade
Living people
Italian rugby union players
Rugby union scrum-halves
Rugby Viadana players
Zebre Parma players